J. E. T. Bowden was a former mayor of Jacksonville, Florida. He was born on September 14, 1857.

References 

1857 births
Mayors of Jacksonville, Florida
Year of death missing